The Klappan Range is a small subrange of the Skeena Mountains of the Interior Mountains, located between Klappan River and Iskut River in northern British Columbia, Canada.

Mountains
Mountains within the Klappan Range include:

Todagin Mountain
Tsatia Mountain
Klappan Mountain

Protected areas
Todagin South Slope Provincial Park
Todagin Wildlife Management Area

See also
Tahltan First Nation
Sacred Headwaters

References

Klappan Range in the Canadian Mountain Encyclopedia

Skeena Mountains
Stikine Country